Shades of Love is a collection of romantic and dramatic made-for-television and direct-to-video films. The films paired well-known leading men with lesser known Canadian actresses. Aired in Canada and sold individually on VHS in North America, the Shades of Love film series was geared towards females who bought romance novels. Each title featured a popular love song that appeared as part of the soundtrack. Some of the later titles were paired with older ones and sold as "A Double Feature Romance".

It was distributed on home video by Lorimar Home Video (formerly Karl/Lorimar Home Video) in the United States, and aired on television on Astral's First Choice cable channel, and had novelization tie-ins from Cloverdale Press, and had a budget of $1 million per episode from the series. It was produced by L/A House Productions, which paid $400,000 million to make the movies.

Titles

Soundtrack
A soundtrack released on vinyl and cassette tape featured songs from many of the films in the series.

Track Listing:
 "Tonight, I Celebrate My Love" – Peabo Bryson and Roberta Flack (from Sincerely, Violet)
 "Baby, Come to Me" – James Ingram & Patti Austin (from Lilac Dream)
 "You are My Lady" – Freddie Jackson (from The Garnet Princess)
 "You're A Part Of Me" – Gene Cotton & Kim Carnes (from The Rose Cafe)
 "Every Time I See Your Picture" – Luba (from Champagne For Two)
 "We've Got Tonight" – Kenny Rogers and Sheena Easton (from Make Mine Chartreuse)
 "The Sweetest Thing (I've Ever Known)" – Juice Newton (from Echoes In Crimson)
 "Wildflower" – Skylark
 "Always Saying Goodbye" – Rex Smith lyrics by Kenneth Atchity (from The Ballerina and The Blues)
 "Moonlight Flight" – lyrics by Kenneth Atchity (from Moonlight Flight)
 "The Queen of Walls" – lyrics by Kenneth Atchity (from  The Garnet Princess)
 "Shades of Love (Theme)" – Lewis Furey
 "Joy to the World" is used in Echoes In Crimson.
 "Good King Wenceslas" is used in Midnight Magic.
 Music from the operas Mefistophile and Madama Butterfly was featured in Little White Lies
 "Jamaica Farewell", a traditional calypso tune, was used in Make Mine Chartreuse'''
 The 3rd movement of the Haydn Trumpet Concerto in E flat was used in Sincerely, Violet.
 The 1st movement of Vivaldi's Violin Concerto in A minor RV356 was used in Midnight Magic.
 The song "Nothing Can Stand In Your Way" by Zappacosta was featured in Sunset Court but not included in the soundtrack release.
 The song "Cruisin'" – by Smokey Robinson was featured in The Emerald Tear but not included in the soundtrack release.
 The song "I Just Fall In Love Again" – by Anne Murray was featured in Tangerine Taxi but not included in the soundtrack release.
 The song "The One By Your Side" by Chantal Condor was featured in Little White Lies but not included in the soundtrack release.
 The song "When a Man Loves a Woman" – covered by Luba, was featured in Midnight Magic but not included in the soundtrack release.
The song "Riptide" – by Robert Palmer was featured in Indigo Autumn but not included in the soundtrack release.
 The song "Can't We Try" – by Dan Hill and Vonda Shepard was featured in The Man Who Guards The Greenhouse but not included in the soundtrack release.
 In addition to performing "Always Saying Goodbye", Rex Smith also performed "Bourbon Street" in The Ballerina and the Blues.

Allusions

 In Echoes In Crimson Grant mentions the film Duck Soup, does an impersonation of Groucho Marx, and reads lines to Anne from William Shakespeare's Twelfth Night.
 In Echoes In Crimson the film It's a Wonderful Life'' plays on the television.

References

External links
The Great Canadian Guide To The Movies & TV
Library And Archives Canada
Is There Gold At The End Of This Rainbow Of Romances?
  
  
  
  
  
  
  
  
  
  
  
  
  
  
  
 

Direct-to-video film series
Canadian television films